Visa requirements for Malagasy citizens are administrative entry restrictions by the authorities of other states placed on citizens of the Madagascar. As of 2 July 2019, Malagasy citizens had visa-free or visa on arrival access to 52 countries and territories, ranking the Malagasy passport 91st in terms of travel freedom (tied with a passport from Guinea-Bissau) according to the Henley Passport Index.

Visa requirements map

Visa requirements

Dependent, Disputed, or Restricted territories
Unrecognized or partially recognized countries

Dependent and autonomous territories

See also

Visa policy of Madagascar
Malagasy passport
List of diplomatic missions in Madagascar

References and Notes
References

Notes

Madagascar
Foreign relations of Madagascar